Edison Armando Caicedo Castro (born March 13, 1990) is an Ecuadorian footballer currently playing for Orense S.C.

References

External links
 

1990 births
Living people
Sportspeople from Esmeraldas, Ecuador
Ecuadorian footballers
Association football fullbacks
C.S.D. Macará footballers
Guayaquil City F.C. footballers
Delfín S.C. footballers